La Sierpe may refer to:

La Sierpe, Cuba
La Sierpe, Spain